The Daily Journal of Commerce (DJC) is a U.S. newspaper published Monday, Wednesday and Friday in Portland, Oregon. It features business, construction, real estate, legal news and public notices. It is a member of American Court & Commercial Newspapers Inc., and the CCN News Service, National Newspaper Association, International Newspaper Promotion Association, Oregon Newspaper Publishers Association, The Associated General Contractors of America, Oregon-Columbia chapter, and Associated Builders and Contractors Inc. DJC is owned by Gannett, through its BridgeTower Media division.

The DJC is read by business professionals in industries such as construction industry, architecture, engineering, commercial real estate, and law. Besides news, each day the DJC displays legal notices and public records from the city of Portland and surrounding governments.

History
The Daily Journal of Commerce was founded by George H. Himes in 1872, and was initially known as the Commercial Reporter. It merged with Sunday Welcome (a competing public notice newspaper in Portland) at some point during the 1930s or 1940s, and was purchased by Dolan Media Company of Minneapolis in 1997. Dolan Media Company changed its name to The Dolan Company in 2010. The Dolan Company changed its name to BridgeTower Media in 2016.

References

External links

 

1872 establishments in Oregon
Business newspapers published in the United States
Newspapers published in Portland, Oregon
Oregon Newspaper Publishers Association
Publications established in 1872
Gannett publications